The 2008-09 season was the 95th season in Aris Thessaloniki F.C.'s existence. The club finished 6th in the Super League.

Aris Thessaloniki was eliminated on penalties in the fifth round of Greek Football Cup by PAOK. On the UEFA Cup, the croatian Slaven Koprivnica eliminated Aris Thessaloniki in the Second qualifying round.

Dušan Bajević removed from manager's position in July. Quique Hernández came after him. In January, Quique Hernández replaced by Iomar Mazinho and his assistant Donato Gama

Aris Thessaloniki hired Giorgos Koltsidas as technical director after his retirement as player.

First-team squad

Transfers and loans

Transfers in

Transfers out

Loans In

Loans Out

Competitions

Overall

Overview

{| class="wikitable" style="text-align: center"
|-
!rowspan=2|Competition
!colspan=8|Record
|-
!
!
!
!
!
!
!
!
|-
| Super League

|-
| Greek Cup

|-
| UEFA Cup

|-
! Total

Super League

Regular season

League table

Results summary

Matches

Greek Football Cup

Fourth round

Fifth round

Fifth Round Replay

UEFA Cup

Second qualifying round

Squad statistics

Appearances

Players with no appearances not included in the list.

Goals

Clean sheets 
If a goalkeeper was substituted and he did not conceded a goal while he was in the game but the team conceded a goal after him, the goalkeeper would not claim the clean sheet.

References

  rsssf.com – Greece 2008/09
  slgr.gr – Team squad for the 2008–09 season
  slgr.gr – Players statistics for the 2008–09 season

External links

Greek football clubs 2008–09 season
2008-09